D'Bora Lippett is an American female dance artist.  She was previously a member of the all-female rap group, Mercedes Ladies.

D'Bora released her first single "No Sense" on New York City based dance label West End Records in 1984. It was released with two different mixes. This was the start of a 15+ year career for the singer.

D'Bora's single, "Dream About You" was a chart-topper in the UK's clubs.  It also topped the import charts, but reached #75 in the UK Singles Chart in September 1991.  The album version was remixed by Steve "Silk" Hurley as a single. The album was called E.S.P and appeared on Smash Records.

Four years later, on a new record label (MCA Records), D'Bora released her US and UK club hit "Going Round". It hit Top 40 in the UK Single Chart.  The follow-up, "Good Love, Real Love", was less successful in the UK Singles Chart (#58). A 1999 single, "Honey", performed worse and failed to reach the UK Top 75.

References

External links

American dance musicians
American women singers
Living people
Year of birth missing (living people)
21st-century American women